"The Strawberry Roan" is a classic American cowboy song, written by California cowboy Curley Fletcher and first published in 1915, as a poem called The Outlaw Broncho. By the early 1930s, the song had become famous; in 1931 it was sung by a cowboy in the Broadway play Green Grow the Lilacs. It has become one of the best-known cowboy songs, found in dozens of collections of American folk music and performed on numerous recordings. Members of the Western Writers of America chose it as one of the Top 100 Western songs of all time.

The song tells the story of a bragging horse breaker who meets his match in a picturesque strawberry roan.

References

External links
 A complete history and exegesis of the song from Ranch & Riata magazine

1915 songs
Western music (North America)
Songs about horses